Cruces Basin Wilderness is a  wilderness area located within the Carson National Forest in New Mexico just south of the Colorado border. The area was added to the National Wilderness Preservation System on December 19, 1980 by Public Law 95-550. It consists of the drainage basins of three small creeks, Cruces, Beaver, and Diablo-Escondido, which join each other and flow into the Rio de los Pinos, a tributary of the Rio Grande, at the northern edge of the wilderness. The western edge of the wilderness is near the Continental Divide Trail.

Flora and fauna 
The area consists of spruce-fir, ponderosa pine, and aspen forests as well as high elevation grassy meadows.  A large fire in 1879 cleared old-growth forest, making room for the aspen forests and meadows present today. The area provides habitat for elk, deer, mountain lion, black bear and coyote. Creeks contain brook, brown, and rainbow trout, as well as beaver.

References

Wilderness areas of New Mexico
Carson National Forest
Protected areas of Rio Arriba County, New Mexico
Protected areas established in 1980
1980 establishments in New Mexico